Boy Hits Car is an American rock band from Los Angeles, formed in 1993.

Biography 
The band was formed in 1993. After releasing their first album, My Animal, independently in 1998, they went on the Sno-Core Tour and recorded their next album, Boy Hits Car, on Wind-up Records. Their song "LoveFuryPassionEnergy" was used as a theme song for WWE Hall of Famer Lita and was distributed on the WWF Forceable Entry album in 2002. A third album was self released in 2005 called The Passage. In 2006 the band re-released the album in July after signing with Rock Ridge Music as their distributor. It was announced on their homepage that they will have a new album with a planned release on March 15, 2011. Boy Hits Car released their 5th studio album All That Led Us Here in May 2014 and are following it up with a European tour.

Peterson stated in a Reddit AMA conducted to mark the self-titled album's 20th anniversary that 12 to 13 tracks had been written for a pending sixth album, with a name for said album still being decided upon.

Musical style and influences
Boy Hits Car was started in 1993 with a simple idea—to write and perform 'passionately heavy music' infused with a world beat/middle eastern flavor. The band cite their influences as Jane's Addiction, Primus, Bad Religion, Talking Heads, Quicksand, Led Zeppelin and Helmet, as well as eastern music such as Ali Akbar Khan.

Members

Current
 Cregg Rondell – vocals, twelve string guitar (1993–present)
 Bill Gower – bass guitar (2006–present)
 Mike Bartak – guitar (2007–present)
 Erik Peterson – drums (2014–present)

Former
 Louis Lenard – guitar – (1993–2006)
 Scott Menville – bass guitar (1993–2006)
 Michael Ferrari  – drums (1993–2003)
 Johnny Ransom – drums (2004–2012)
 Dusty Hunt – guitar (2005–2007)
 Will Jenkins – drums (2012–2013)

Discography 
My Animal (1998) (NMG Records)
Boy Hits Car (2001) (Wind-Up Records)
The Passage (independently released in 2005, then re-released in 2006 through Rock Ridge Music)
Stealing Fire (2011) (March 15, 2011)
All That Led Us Here (2014)
Worldwide Alive (2020)

References

External links

Official website

Musical groups from Los Angeles
Alternative rock groups from California
American alternative metal musical groups
Musical groups established in 1993
1993 establishments in California
Rock Ridge Music artists